Joseph Junior Ghislain Madozein (born October 10, 1987) is a Central African professional basketball player who last played for ASOPT of the Central African Division I Basketball League.

International career 
Madozein played for the Central African Republic national basketball team at the AfroBasket 2007, where he averaged 1.7 points, 1.3 rebounds, and 0.8 assists. On June 26, 2015, he was one of 20 players to be called up for the team's preliminary squad for the AfroBasket 2015 by head coach Aubin-Thierry Goporo. Others included Romain Sato and James Mays.

References

External links 
Junior Madozein at RealGM
Junior Madozein at AfroBasket.com

Living people
1987 births
People from Bangui
Central African Republic men's basketball players
Point guards